The Coronado Performing Arts Center (originally the Coronado Theatre), in Rockford, Illinois, is a 2,400-seat theatre, designed by architect Frederic J. Klein. The theatre cost $1.5 million to build, and opened on October 9, 1927.

Interior

The theatre's elaborate auditorium is designed according to the atmospheric style popular in movie houses built in the 1920s. This style simulates an outdoor theater-going experience. The Coronado's auditorium walls are decorated with facades of gilded Spanish and Italian-style buildings, and the ceiling looks like a deep blue sky filled with twinkling stars and floating clouds. The auditorium is full of gilded detail. Green stained-glass lamps with fluted bulbs adorn the walls. Japanese dragons and glowing lanterns cover the organ screens on either side of the stage. Seating is on two levels, the main floor and a sizeable balcony. At the front of the theatre, in front and below the stage is an orchestra pit. Incorporated into the gilded sides of the interior of the theatre hall are several alcoves that resemble box seats along the sides, which can be accessed from the balcony level but usually do not have seats. All seats are covered with plush red velvet.

The lobby and mezzanine level are as elaborately designed as the auditorium. One of the grand mezzanine's focal points is a statue of Venus standing in front of a golden seashell. Because of its breathtaking interior design, the Coronado is sentimentally referred to as "Rockford's Wonder Theatre."

Events
During its early years, the Coronado played host to both movies and live stage shows.

Its opening show was a silent film called "Swim Girl Swim." Nearly 9,000 people flocked to the three opening-day showings.

During the theatre's heyday which lasted from its opening until the 1960s, such famous stage acts as Frank Sinatra, Judy Garland, Bob Hope, Sammy Davis Jr. & Milton Berle appeared at the Coronado.

During his 1960 Presidential campaign, John F. Kennedy made a stop there.

In 1984, the Coronado ceased showing movies because of a decline in revenue.

In celebration of the 2018 Illinois Bicentennial, the Coronado Theatre was selected as one of the Illinois 200 Great Places  by the American Institute of Architects Illinois component (AIA Illinois).

National landmark
In 1979, the Coronado was added to the National Register of Historic Places. At the dedication ceremony, it was referred to as one of the premiere theaters of its kind in the nation.

In 1980, the City of Rockford made the Coronado an historical landmark of the state of Illinois.

On 1 July 2010, the Coronado Theater was voted "the No. 1 Architectural Wonder of the United States, based on receiving the most votes in an AOL/U.S. Travel Association poll. It finished with 6,511 votes (30 percent), while the Government Bridge in Rock Island was second at 3,816 (17.6 percent). The 250-room Biltmore residence in Ashville, N.C., was third at 2,781."

Restoration project
Kerasotes Theater Organization, owner of the Coronado Theatre since 1970, donated the property to the City of Rockford in 1997. Plans to preserve and renovate the theater followed immediately. The Friends of the Coronado, founded in 1998, began an $18.5 million restoration project a year later. Rockford community members supported the restoration by donating nearly half of the required funds. The project's goals were both to restore the theater's deteriorating interior and bring the building structure up-to-date. The restoration project not only preserved the existing features of the theater, it also provided the theater with more usable space. Additionally, the Coronado is now a fully handicapped accessible building. After 18 months of construction, the Coronado reopened in 2001 with a black-tie celebration.

Grand Barton Organ
The Coronado is home to one of only two remaining Grand Barton Theater Organs that feature a unique dragon design. The organ is a 4 manual, 17 rank instrument that features many of the common stops that came with theater organs of the day such as bird calls, car horns, and other sounds necessary to add substance in the silent movie age. The Organ is under the care of the Land of Lincoln Theater Organ Society, which offers year-round tours and demonstrations.

Today
The Coronado has always been a source of pride for Rockford citizens. Today, the Coronado combines completely modern amenities with its original 1920s decor. With more backstage area and added dressing rooms, the Coronado now plays host to large traveling theater companies and famous headlining acts. The expanded lobby space accommodates the increased number of theater-goers that attend concerts and events held on a regular basis.

See also

 List of concert halls
 Barton Organ Company

References

External links
 Coronado Theatre website
Illinois Great Places - Coronado Theatre
Society of Architectural Historians SAH ARCHIPEDIA entry on the Coronado Theatre

Culture of Rockford, Illinois
Buildings and structures in Rockford, Illinois
National Register of Historic Places in Winnebago County, Illinois
Theatres in Illinois
Tourist attractions in Rockford, Illinois
Theatres on the National Register of Historic Places in Illinois
Historic district contributing properties in Illinois
Theatres completed in 1927
Public venues with a theatre organ